A House Divided may refer to:

Film
A House Divided (1913 film), a film by Alice Guy-Blaché
A House Divided (1919 film), a 1919 American film by J. Stuart Blackton
A House Divided (1931 film), a film by William Wyler
A House Divided (television film), a 2000 film featuring Sean McCann
A House Divided (TV documentary), a film nominated at the 2003 1st Irish Film & Television Awards
A House Divided (2008 film), a film by Mitch Davis

Gaming
 A House Divided (board game), a strategic wargame about the American Civil War
 A House Divided, an expansion pack for Victoria II
 A House Divided, an episode of The Walking Dead: Season Two

Television
 A House Divided (TV series), a 2019 drama series
 "A House Divided" (Dallas), an episode of Dallas
 "House Divided", an episode of House
 "A House Divided" (Person of Interest), an episode of Person of Interest
 "A House Divided" (Upstairs, Downstairs), an episode of Upstairs, Downstairs
 "A House Divided", an episode of Home Improvement
 "A House Divided", an episode of Jersey Shore

Other uses
 A House Divided (novel), a 1935 novel by Pearl S. Buck
 "A House Divided" (song), a 1993 song by Rick Price

See also
 Lincoln's House Divided Speech, a speech by Abraham Lincoln
 "Living in a House Divided", a 1972 song by Cher
"A Milhouse Divided", an episode of The Simpsons
 Mark 3, a chapter in the Bible